Hexacosta is a trilobite in the order Phacopida (family Acastidae), that existed during the middle Devonian in what is now Afghanistan. It was described by Farsan in 1981, and the type species is Hexacosta zendadjanensis.

References

External links
 Hexacosta at the Paleobiology Database

Acastidae
Fossil taxa described in 1981
Devonian trilobites of Asia
Devonian animals of Asia